Route 124 is a  north–south state highway located in the towns of Harwich and Brewster in the U.S. state of Massachusetts. Its southern terminus is at Route 28 and Route 39 in Harwich and its northern terminus is at Route 6A in Brewster.

Route description

Route 124 begins at the intersection of Route 28, overlapping Route 39. It leaves Route 39 next to the First Parish Church in downtown Harwich. After , the road passes the Mid-Cape Highway at Exit 82 off the Mid-Cape Highway. After  the Cape Cod Rail Trail bike path crosses over and follows alongside the road for another . The road crosses Route 137 after .

History
Route 124 was formerly designated Route 24, prior to the completion of the initial stretch of the current Route 24 freeway in 1951. When the freeway was given the Route 24 designation, the existing Route 24 was renumbered to 124.

Major intersections

References

Numbered routes in Massachusetts
Transportation in Barnstable County, Massachusetts
Brewster, Massachusetts
Harwich, Massachusetts